Kyle Layman "Buddy" Cruze (May 24, 1933 – March 10, 2018) was an American football player at the University of Tennessee.  A native of Knoxville, Tennessee, Cruze attended Knoxville High School and East High School.  He attended Southern Methodist University and thereafter transferred to the University of Tennessee.  He played college football at the end position in 1952 for the SMU Mustangs and from 1954 to 1956 for the Tennessee Volunteers.  He was selected by the Football Writers Association of America as a first-team player on its 1956 College Football All-America Team. After leaving the University of Tennessee he was 143rd pick overall and drafted by the Chicago Bears in the 1956 NFL Draft. He later signed with the Montreal Alouettes in 1959.  He was inducted into the Tennessee Sports Hall of Fame in 2007. He died on March 10, 2018, at the age of 84.

References

1933 births
2018 deaths
American football ends
SMU Mustangs football players
Tennessee Volunteers football players
Players of American football from Knoxville, Tennessee